In heraldry, an ordinary componée (anciently gobonnée), anglicised to compony and gobony,  is composed of a row of squares, rectangles or other quadrilaterals, of alternating tinctures, often found as a  bordure, most notably in the arms of the English House of Beaufort.

Certain charges cannot be compony, for practical reasons, for example  common charges and the chief as they are generally not long and thin in shape. The alternative for thicker shapes is paly or barry, as shown for example in the arms of Strangways, featuring lions paly argent and gules.

Usually only two tinctures are used, but the arms of Formia, Italy, show an unusual bordure which could be blazoned compony of 24 vert, gules, argent, vert, argent, gules.

A variant is counter-compony, with two rows of panes.

A bordure compony can be used as a difference to delineate cadency and often indicates an illegitimate son, acknowledged but legally barred from inheritance of the feudal estates of his father. The first Earl of Somerset was later legitimized (allowed to inherit the feudal estates) by an act of Parliament, yet retained his original arms as also displayed by his legitimate descendants.

A bend or fess billety-counter-billety is, in effect, chequy of three rows of stretched (rather than square) panes, as in the arms of Cullimore in Canada: Azure; a fess billetty counter billetty gules and argent, between, in chief, two crescents and, in base, a wheel or; a bordure or for difference.

Sometimes compony-like arrangements, such as in the arms of the Duke de Vargas Machuca, are not so described in blazon. The coat of arms of the 108th Aviation Regiment of the United States Army is blazoned bordered gyronny of ten.

Notes

Heraldry